The 2011 Huddersfield Giants season was their 148th in the Rugby Football League, and its 13th in Super League. This season saw the Fartowners finish in fourth place and lose both of their playoff matches, which The Guardian and Love Rugby League described as disappointing given their strong start to the season. The Claret and Gold were at top spot three times in the year, before a mid-season slump caused them to drop down the table, and finish fourth; the significant achievement was finishing above every other Yorkshire team.

Table

Pre-season

The Giants Started preseason with a 30–18 loss to Batley Bulldogs, then they came back to the Galpharm for Eorl Crabtree's testimonial match against Hull Kingston Rovers, an experimental side beat the Robins 18–12. They then faced their toughest test, against St. Helens, winning against a relatively full-strength team.

Season results

 Three home games played at The Shay in Halifax

Season review
February 2011

The First Match of the campaign was against title rivals Warrington Wolves whose signings included Joel Monaghan, and Giants Man of Steel and Captain, Brett Hodgson. The Match was a fitting opening for the Wolves, who were knocked out of the running for a historic double, by a length of the field effort from Leroy Cudjoe in the Play-offs. 
Huddersfield came out victors by 28–18. Then they travelled to Castleford, who were top of the table, in what was dubbed somewhat prematurely a 'Top of the Table' clash, a wet weather game slowed the Fartowners, who left Wheldon Road losers 12–18. In the first home game of the year, they faced Hull F.C. in front of the Huddersfield Crowd – after an early shock, they ran out 20–10 winners.

March 2011

The Giants started March with a hard trip down to in-form Harlequins who were in the midst of their best start in their history. After another scrappy affair, the Giants finished the game 18–10 winners. They returned to Yorkshire to face rivals Bradford Bulls at the Galpharm Stadium. In a rout, the Bulls were beaten 50–16, with tries from Jermaine McGillvary, Leroy Cudjoe, David Fa'alogo, Scott Grix, new signing Dale Ferguson, Graeme Horne and Larne Patrick and 7 goals from Danny Brough. 
In their biggest game yet, they faced an injury effected Wigan, however after an impressive performance from Josh Charnley and Sean O'Loughlin, they lost 20–6. After this defeat, they travelled to Craven Park to face Hull Kingston Rovers. 
After floodlight troubles threatened to harm the match, the visitors played some great Rugby, and won 38–16.

April 2011

The Claret and Gold started April hosting Wakefield Trinity, a spirited performance by Wakefield against a much changed Fartown team saw Wakefield scare them, only leading 6–4 at Half-Time. By the end of the match, they led 34–10. Then they hosted the Warrington Wolves again at the Galpharm, which after a superb performance, they ran out 29–10 winners. They then went to Headingley, searching for their first ever win there in the Super League era. Over 3,000 fans turned out to see a historic victory, a heated affair, with 2 sending offs, a fight, and six Huddersfield tries, the game finished 38–6, and marked a new era in Huddersfield Giants history. During the Easter Period, they started on a Tuesday night at home to Salford City Reds, where despite the visiting side showing some clever and pretty rugby, they ended the game with a 52–22, picking up the 2 points. They then travelled to the South of France to face an excellent Catalans Dragons side. After a Scott Dureau drop goal, the Giants unluckily lost 13–12.

May 2011

The Giants played just two Super League games during May. Returning for a Saturday Night 'Clash of the Titans' with St. Helens, the Giants won 40–18 against the Injury ravaged Saints side. After which they returned to the KC Stadium, they played Hull F.C. on the same day as the 2011 League One Play-off Final, winning 34–20, with tries from Michael Lawrence, Danny Brough, Lee Gilmour and a hat trick from veteran winger David Hodgson.

June 2011

Huddersfield started June at The Shay, where the team would play until urgent pitch work would be completed at their home ground, The Galpharm Stadium, with a game versus the Castleford Tigers. The Tigers and the Giants both wore their predominantly white kit. The mix up was sorted when the Tigers wore a Halifax old shirt. The Giants ran in eight tries in a 40–18 rout in front of a crowd of over 5,000. They then travelled to Wakefield Trinity, where the home team upset the Top-4 Giants in a 13–10 win. At their second 'On the Road' game in Halifax, they beat Catalans 28–20 on Sky Television, the highlight of the match being a Damien Blanch try for the visitors. The Giants ended the month at Wigan in a match labelled 'The Big One' with a huge ticketing push from both teams attracted a 19,169 crowd to the DW Stadium, the Giants were outplayed, and Wigan won easily 46–12, with Hodgson and Kirmond getting the only tries.

July 2011

The Start of July was the end of the Giants time at The Shay, where the played Crusaders, in front of their smallest crowd of the year, 4,892. With 12 points to the Debuting Gregg McNally, the Giants beat the Bottom of the Table Crusaders 40–12. They then went to the Halliwell Jones Stadium to visit Warrington Wolves, who wanted revenge after losing the last 3 against the Giants, after being behind 22–0 at half time, found hard, but fell short. After this they faced what must be the most disappointing result of the year, a 36–0 humiliation by the Bradford Bulls. The Giants returned to the Galpharm Stadium with a homecoming victory, in the last game of July, they beat Hull Kingston Rovers and made 4th spot a little safer again.

August 2011

Pulling towards the 'Business End' of the Season, the Giants faced St. Helens in [Widnes]'s Halton Stadium, Saints temporary home. They outplayed the Giants, who never looked like threatening. In a close fought match, the Giants still lost out 19–6, Foster kicking 3. They then travelled to the Willows, expecting a victory, but in a disappointing turn of events, lost out 24–18. Huddersfield had won just 4 in 10.

September 2011

In the last two games pulling towards the play-offs, the Giants hosted two very different sides, Harlequins had looked good early on, but since the last time the two sides met, they had slumped, and would have been bottom, if not for points deductions to Wakefield Trinity and Crusaders. The Giants however pulled out all the stops, and hammered the enthusiastic, but ultimately unsuccessful Quins side. They then hosted Leeds Rhinos, in a match dubbed 'the Battle of Yorkshire', although Huddersfield had already secured 4th spot, ahead of the Loiners. In a tight affair, Leeds beat the confident Giants side, looking to do a double, by 7 points, 24–31.

Play-offs

In the first week of the play-offs, without Leroy Cudjoe, Shaun Lunt and Joe Wardle, the Giants were hammered by an excellent Warrington Wolves side, although the refereeing of Steve Ganson was called into question, with Nathan Brown, Huddersfield's coach, saying '[Ganson] obviously got the game wrong the other day'. The Giants then hosted the Leeds Rhinos.

2011 Squad

Transfers

In

Out

References 

Huddersfield Giants seasons